is a Japanese adult video (AV) production company based in Tokyo's Shinjuku ward.

Company information
Shuttle Japan specializes in videos featuring outdoor exhibitionism, bukkake and gokkun as well as other fetish genres. The company registered the term "ぶっかけ/ＢＵＫＫＡＫＥ" as a trademark (No. ４５４５１３７) in January 2001.

The company operates a website, www.shuttle-japan.com, which distributes its videos. The site, in Japanese and English, has been registered to the company since October 1996. As of mid-2009, the company website listed more than 1300 available Shuttle Japan titles.

Notes

External links
 Official Website

Japanese pornographic film studios
Mass media companies based in Tokyo
Bukkake